Tile Cross is an area in the east of the city of Birmingham, England. It lies within the historic county of Warwickshire.

It is a small area with a shopping centre on the borders of Stechford, Marston Green and the Radleys. The name originates from the tile production at the former quarry that existed on what is now parkland between St Peter's C of E Church and Shirestone School. Landmarks in the area include Our Lady Help of Christians Catholic Church, a Grade II listed building, which has an associated primary school, and nearby Sheldon Hall, a Grade II* listed building.

External links

Areas of Birmingham, West Midlands